Kidron is a moshav in central Israel. Located in the Shephelah just east of Gedera, and near the Tel Nof Airbase, it falls under the jurisdiction of Brenner Regional Council.

History
The moshav was established in 1949 by a group of Jewish immigrants from Yugoslavia. It was  named for the Kidron Valley. They were later joined by Jewish immigrants from Romania.

It was established on the land of the depopulated Palestinian  village of Qatra, which became depopulated in the 1948 Arab–Israeli War.

References

Moshavim
Populated places established in 1949
Populated places in Central District (Israel)
Romanian-Jewish culture in Israel
1949 establishments in Israel
Yugoslav-Jewish culture in Israel